The meridian 62° east of Greenwich is a line of longitude that extends from the North Pole across the Arctic Ocean, Europe, Asia, the Indian Ocean, the Southern Ocean, and Antarctica to the South Pole.

The 62nd meridian east forms a great circle with the 118th meridian west.

From Pole to Pole
Starting at the North Pole and heading south to the South Pole, the 60th meridian east passes through:

{| class="wikitable plainrowheaders"
! scope="col" width="115" | Co-ordinates
! scope="col" | Country, territory or sea
! scope="col" | Notes
|-
| style="background:#b0e0e6;" | 
! scope="row" style="background:#b0e0e6;" | Arctic Ocean
| style="background:#b0e0e6;" |
|-
| 
! scope="row" | 
| Adelaide Island and Frieden Island, Franz Josef Land, Arkhangelsk Oblast
|-
| style="background:#b0e0e6;" | 
! scope="row" style="background:#b0e0e6;" | Arctic Ocean
| style="background:#b0e0e6;" |
|-
| 
! scope="row" | 
| Wilczek Island, Franz Josef Land, Arkhangelsk Oblast
|-
| style="background:#b0e0e6;" | 
! scope="row" style="background:#b0e0e6;" | Barents Sea
| style="background:#b0e0e6;" |
|-
| 
! scope="row" | 
| Severny Island, Novaya Zemlya, Arkhangelsk Oblast
|-
| style="background:#b0e0e6;" | 
! scope="row" style="background:#b0e0e6;" | Kara Sea
| style="background:#b0e0e6;" |
|-
| 
! scope="row" | 
|Nenetsia, Komi, Khantia-Mansia, Sverdlovsk Ob., Chelyabinsk Ob., Kurgan Ob.
|-
| 
! scope="row" | 
| Kostanay Region
|-
| 
! scope="row" | 
| Chelyabinsk Oblast
|-
| 
! scope="row" | 
| Kostanay Reg., Aktobe Reg., Kyzylorda Reg.
|-
| 
! scope="row" | 
|
|-
| 
! scope="row" | 
|
|-
| 
! scope="row" | 
|
|-
| 
! scope="row" | 
| Balochistan
|-
| 
! scope="row" | 
|
|-
| 
! scope="row" | 
| Balochistan
|-
| style="background:#b0e0e6;" | 
! scope="row" style="background:#b0e0e6;" | Indian Ocean
| style="background:#b0e0e6;" |
|-
| style="background:#b0e0e6;" | 
! scope="row" style="background:#b0e0e6;" | Southern Ocean
| style="background:#b0e0e6;" |
|-
| 
! scope="row" | Antarctica
| Australian Antarctic Territory, claimed by 
|-
|}

See also
61st meridian east
63rd meridian east

e062 meridian east